Fiesco is a comune (municipality) in the Province of Cremona in the Italian region Lombardy, located about  southeast of Milan and about  northwest of Cremona.

Fiesco borders the following municipalities: Castelleone, Izano, Salvirola, Trigolo.

References

Cities and towns in Lombardy